Jesus healing an infirm woman is one of the miracles of Jesus in the Gospels (Luke  13:10-17).

Biblical accounts
According to the Gospel, Jesus was teaching in one of the synagogues on Sabbath, and a woman was there who had been crippled by a spirit for eighteen years. She was bent over and could not straighten up at all. When Jesus saw her, he called her forward and said to her:

"Woman, you are set free from your infirmity."

Then he put his hands on her, and immediately she straightened up and praised God.

Indignant because Jesus had healed on Sabbath, the synagogue ruler said to the people, "There are six days for work. So come and be healed on those days, not on the Sabbath."

Jesus answered him:

"You hypocrites! Doesn't each of you on the Sabbath untie his ox or donkey from the stall and lead it out to give it water? Then should not this woman, a daughter of Abraham, whom Satan has kept bound for eighteen long years, be set free on the Sabbath day from what bound her?"

When he said this, all his opponents were humiliated, but the people were delighted with all the wonderful things he was doing.

Commentary
Cornelius a Lapide comments that the woman "crippled by a spirit" shows "that diseases are often sent by the devils, through the permission of God, for sins or other reasons." This agrees with verse 16 which states, that the woman "Satan had kept bound for eighteen long years." In the same manner the devil afflicted Job with various diseases (Job 2, see also Ps. 78:49). He further writes that, "the devil, therefore, made this woman crooked and bent, to compel her always to look down upon the earth."

John McEvilly writes that the verb "loosed" (gk: λύω) is used in this passage because previously her sinews and muscles had been contracted, while after the cure, "immediately she was straight,” and the curvature was gone. Thus she assumed the natural straightness of her body.

See also

 Life of Jesus in the New Testament
 Ministry of Jesus
 Parables of Jesus

References

Miracles of Jesus
Women in the New Testament
Gospel of Luke